Ženski košarkaški klub Kovin, commonly referred to as ŽKK Kovin, is a women's professional basketball club based in Kovin, Serbia

History 
Kovin competed in the Ronchetti Cup in 1998, 1999 and 2001.

In September 2011, Kovin came out from competing in the First Women's Basketball League of Serbia.

Honours

Domestic
National Cups – 1
Cup of FR Yugoslavia:
Winners (1): 2000

Notable former players
  Mina Maksimović
  Miljana Bojović
  Dragoslava Žakula
  Marina Marković
  Nevena Jovanović
  Tatjana Živanović

Notable former coaches
  Dragomir Bukvić
  Zoran Kovačić
  Miroslav Kanjevac

See also 
 List of basketball clubs in Serbia by major honours won

References

External links
 Team Profile at eurobasket.com

Kovin
Sport in Kovin
Basketball teams established in 1990